A Fourth for Bridge is a 1957 Australian TV play starring Richard Meikle. It aired on the ABC.

Plot
Several POWs travel in Italian aircraft in World War Two. They play a card game.

Cast
Hans Eisler 		
Al Garcia 		
Nigel Lovell as the Air Force Type		
Richard Meikle	
Don Pascoe as the Hussar 		
Melpo Zarokosta

Production
It was directed by Alan Burke, who was borrowed from the Elizabethan Theatre Trust. It was the first directing he did for the ABC. "In those days there were really no people there to provide support and guidance," recalled Burke. "All one could do was talk to other producers afterwards. What I was not confident was 'calling the shots'. But as we had only 2 cameras in those days it was not a big problem."

See also
List of live television plays broadcast on Australian Broadcasting Corporation (1950s)

References

External links

Australian television plays
1957 television plays
Films directed by Alan Burke (director)